Estonia competed at the 1994 Winter Olympics in Lillehammer, Norway.

Competitors
The following is the list of number of competitors in the Games.

Alpine skiing

Men

Biathlon

Men

Women

Cross-country skiing

Men

Women

Figure skating

Men

Luge

Nordic combined

References

Official Olympic Reports

External links
 EOK – Lillehammer 1994 

Nations at the 1994 Winter Olympics
1994
1994 in Estonian sport